Errol Rattigan (born 17 June 1956) is a Jamaican cricketer. He played in one first-class match for the Jamaican cricket team in 1973/74.

See also
 List of Jamaican representative cricketers

References

External links
 

1956 births
Living people
Jamaican cricketers
Jamaica cricketers
Place of birth missing (living people)